Chris Klein (born January 4, 1976, in St. Louis, Missouri) is an American former soccer player who spent 13 seasons in Major League Soccer and earned 23 caps with the United States men's national soccer team. Currently, he is the President of LA Galaxy, promoted on January 28, 2013, from vice president.

Klein spent the entirety of his 12-year professional career playing in Major League Soccer, for the Kansas City Wizards, Real Salt Lake and Los Angeles Galaxy, winning the MLS Cup and Supporters' Shield with Kansas City in 2000, and the Supporters' Shield with Los Angeles in 2010, his last year as a professional. He was notable for his fitness and resilience to injury, setting an MLS record in 2008 when he made his 118th consecutive first team start. Klein was also a veteran member of the United States national team during the early 2000s; he acquired 23 caps, scored 5 goals, and represented his country at the 2003 Confederations Cup.

Career

Amateur
Klein attended De Smet Jesuit High School, and then played three years of college soccer at Indiana University from 1994 to 1997. In total, he started 88 games for the Hoosiers, registering 11 goals and 11 assists as a senior.

Professional
Upon his graduation, Klein was selected fourth overall by the Kansas City Wizards in the 1998 MLS College Draft. He received little playing time as a rookie, starting eight games and substituting into nine, and scored no points. Starting in 1999, however, Klein began to cement a place for himself as one of the league's best midfielders; in the 1999 season, Klein started 24 games for the Wizards, registering six goals and five assists. He started 26 games in 2000, scoring six goals and eight assists, helping the Wizards to an MLS Cup victory. Klein has been an equally important part of the Wizards midfield for the last four years, although his 2004 campaign was cut short by a torn ACL. He came back in 2005 and was named MLS Comeback Player of the Year for the second time in his career, his first coming in 2002. However, before the 2006 season, Klein was traded with an international roster spot to Real Salt Lake for allocation money.

On June 21, 2007, Klein was traded to Los Angeles Galaxy for midfielder Nathan Sturgis and forward Robbie Findley.

International
Klein was a fringe player for the United States national team for several years. He received his first cap October 25, 2000 against Mexico, his debut for the men's national team at any age level. He has played in a total of 22 games for the national team, scoring five goals; his best year was 2003, when he played in seven games, and scored three goals.

After playing career
Klein currently is the President of LA Galaxy. He also serves as an assistant coach for Newport Mesa Soccer Club, which is part of the West Ham International Academy.

Personal life
Klein is married with three children. He and his wife are evangelical Christians, and Klein is active with the Fellowship of Christian Athletes. Klein resides in suburban Los Angeles with his family.

Honors

Kansas City Wizards
Lamar Hunt U.S. Open Cup (1): 2004
Major League Soccer MLS Cup (1): 2000
Major League Soccer Supporters' Shield (1): 2000
Major League Soccer Western Conference Championship (2): 2000, 2004

Los Angeles Galaxy
Major League Soccer Supporters' Shield (1): 2010
Major League Soccer Western Conference Championship (1): 2009

References

External links

1976 births
Living people
American soccer players
United States men's international soccer players
2003 FIFA Confederations Cup players
Sporting Kansas City players
MLS Pro-40 players
Real Salt Lake players
LA Galaxy players
Indiana Hoosiers men's soccer players
Major League Soccer players
Major League Soccer All-Stars
A-League (1995–2004) players
Soccer players from St. Louis
Sporting Kansas City draft picks
Association football midfielders